The 1861 Sumatra earthquake occurred on 16 February and was the last in a sequences of earthquakes that ruptured adjacent parts of the Sumatran segment of the Sunda megathrust. It caused a devastating tsunami which led to several thousand fatalities. The earthquake was felt as far away as the Malay peninsula and the eastern part of Java. The rupture area for the 2005 Nias–Simeulue earthquake is similar to that estimated for the 1861 event.

Background
The island of Sumatra lies on the convergent plate boundary between the Indo-Australian Plate and the Eurasian Plate. The convergence between these plates is highly oblique near Sumatra, with the displacement being accommodated by near pure dip-slip faulting along the subduction zone, known as the Sunda megathrust, and near pure strike-slip faulting along the Great Sumatran fault. The major slip events on the subduction zone interface are typically of megathrust type. Historically, great or giant megathrust earthquakes have been recorded in 1797, 1833, 1861, 2004, 2005 and 2007, most of them being associated with devastating tsunamis. Smaller (but still large) megathrust events have also occurred in the small gaps between the areas that slip during the larger events, in 1935, 1984, 2000 and 2002.

Damage
Villages along the seaward side of the Batu Islands  were devastated. The combined effects of the earthquake and tsunami caused several thousand fatalities.

Characteristics

Earthquake
There is evidence of coseismic uplift of Nias, with exposure of reefs and rock piers. There were six major aftershocks over the next seven months, the last of which, on 27 September caused a damaging tsunami. It was the longest earthquake ever recorded, with the shift of the plate taking around 32 years to unfurl.

Tsunami
At least 500 km of coastline were affected by the tsunami with run-ups of up to 7m recorded on the southwest side of Nias.

See also
List of earthquakes in Indonesia
List of historical earthquakes
List of historical tsunamis
Slow earthquake
1843 Nias earthquake

References

External links
An earthquake lasted 32 years, and scientists want to know how-National Geographic Society

Types of earthquake

Megathrust earthquakes in Sumatra
1861 tsunamis
Sumatra Earthquake, 1861
1861 in Indonesia
Sum
Tsunamis in Indonesia
February 1861 events
1861 disasters in Oceania
19th-century disasters in Indonesia
1861 disasters in Asia